Walter Attewell (29 January 1865 – 3 January 1919) was an English cricketer active in first-class cricket in the 1890s, making five appearances for four different teams.

Attewell made his debut in first-class cricket when he was selected to play for Nottinghamshire in the County Championship against Surrey at Trent Bridge in 1891, in what was his one and only appearance at first-class level for Nottinghamshire. He later worked as a traveling cricket coach, and by 1894, he was working in Philadelphia. While in the United States, Attewell played further first-class matches in 1894, making two appearances for the Players of United States of America against the Gentlemen of Philadelphia, one appearance for RH Powell's XI against GS Patterson's XI, and once appearance for AM Wood's XI against GS Patterson's XI. He took one five wicket haul in his brief first-class career, taking 5/81 for the Players of United States of America against the Gentlemen of Philadelphia. From 1906 to 1912, he worked for Shrewsbury School as their cricket coach, where he was assisted by Neville Cardus.

He died at the village of his birth on 3 January 1919. Two of his cousins were also notable cricketers: William Attewell played Test cricket for England, as well as playing for Nottinghamshire, while Thomas Attewell played intermittently for Nottinghamshire in the 1890s.

Note and references

External links
Walter Attewell at ESPNcricinfo
Walter Attewell at CricketArchive

1865 births
1919 deaths
People from Keyworth
Cricketers from Nottinghamshire
English cricketers
Nottinghamshire cricketers
Players of United States of America cricketers
English cricket coaches